Edmond "Ned" Lambe (born 1866) was an Irish hurler who played for the Tipperary senior team.

Lambe made his first appearance for the team during the inaugural championship of 1887. During that successful year he won one All-Ireland medal.

At club level Lambe was a one-time county club championship medalist with Upperchurch–Drombane.

References

1866 births
Upperchurch-Drombane hurlers
Tipperary inter-county hurlers
All-Ireland Senior Hurling Championship winners
People from County Tipperary
Year of death missing